Emil Voigt (December 15, 1879 – February 26, 1946) was an American gymnast who competed in the 1904 Summer Olympics.

In 1904 he won the silver medal in the club swinging event and bronze medals in the rings event and rope climbing event. He was also fourth in gymnastics' team event, 42nd in gymnastics' triathlon event, 60th in gymnastics' all-around event and 85th in athletics' triathlon event. He was a member of the Concordia Turnverein in St. Louis.

References

1879 births
1946 deaths
American male artistic gymnasts
Gymnasts at the 1904 Summer Olympics
Olympic silver medalists for the United States in gymnastics
Olympic bronze medalists for the United States in gymnastics
Medalists at the 1904 Summer Olympics